Facundo Quintana (born 28 January 1996) is an Argentine footballer who plays as a striker for Flandria.

Club career 
Quintana is a youth exponent from Estudiantes. At 18 February 2016, he made his first team debut in a league game against Tigre in a 1–1 draw.

On 22 January 2019, Quintana signed with LDU Portoviejo in Ecuador. One year later, he moved to Spanish club Salamanca CF UDS. However, he wasn't presented before March 2020 due to the COVID-19 pandemic.

Quintana made no official appearances for Salamanca, before he returned to Argentine, where he signed with Los Andes on 8 October 2020.

References

1996 births
Argentine footballers
Argentine expatriate footballers
Association football midfielders
Club Atlético River Plate footballers
Universidad de Chile footballers
Estudiantes de La Plata footballers
Arsenal de Sarandí footballers
L.D.U. Portoviejo footballers
Salamanca CF UDS players
Club Atlético Los Andes footballers
Flandria footballers
Argentine Primera División players
Primera Nacional players
Ecuadorian Serie B players
Primera B Metropolitana players
Living people
Argentine expatriate sportspeople in Chile
Argentine expatriate sportspeople in Ecuador
Argentine expatriate sportspeople in Spain
Expatriate footballers in Chile
Expatriate footballers in Ecuador
Expatriate footballers in Spain
Footballers from Buenos Aires